Montmorency County is a county located in the U.S. state of Michigan. As of the 2020 Census, the population was 9,153, making it the second-least populous county in Michigan's Lower Peninsula, behind its southern neighbor, Oscoda County. The county seat is Atlanta.

Montmorency County is part of Northern Michigan, and is part of the Lake Huron watershed. The Thunder Bay River, which drains much of the county, flows to Lake Huron's Thunder Bay at Alpena.

History

The county was created by the Michigan Legislature in 1840 as Cheonoquet County, after a well-known Chippewa (also known as Ojibwa) Chief, whose name meant Big Cloud. Cheonoquet took part in Indian treaties in 1807, 1815, 1825 and 1837. Renamed Montmorency County on March 8, 1843, it was originally spelled Montmorenci, and historians conjecture this reflects the area's French-Canadian influence: the French Duke of Montmorency purchased a lieutenant governorship in Canada and the first archbishop of Canada—Montmorency-Laval—both could be influences on the county's name. (There was no "Count Morenci" aiding the American Revolution). The county was organized in 1881. The reason for the change in spelling is subject to some dispute.  See List of Michigan county name etymologies. The name Montmorency probably means Mountain Moor.  Montmorency is a boggy land or moor that is at the top of a broad mount or highland. When the county was organized in 1881, some land area was taken from Cheboygan and Alpena counties. Three townships were divided: Briley, Montmorency and Rust. By 1901 Albert, Hillman Township and Wheatfield were added. Brush Creek, now known as Hillman, was the first county seat.  In 1891 the county seat was moved to Atlanta.

Geography
Although it lies on Michigan's Lower Peninsula, Montmorency County is considered to be part of Northern Michigan.

Most of the county is covered by state forest land. There is an abundance of lakes, such as Long Lake. Glaciers shaped the area, creating a unique regional ecosystem. A large portion of the area is the Grayling outwash plain, a broad outwash plain including sandy ice-disintegration ridges, jack pine barrens, some white pine-red pine forest, and northern hardwood forest. Large lakes were created by glacial action.

Adjacent counties

Presque Isle County - northeast
Alpena County - east
Alcona County - southeast
Oscoda County - south
Crawford County - southwest
Otsego County - west
Cheboygan County - northwest

Major highways

There are no traffic lights in Montmorency county, although a few blinking lights exist at highway junctions.

Demographics

As of the 2000 United States Census, there were 10,315 people, 4,455 households, and 3,047 families residing in the county. The population density was 19 people per square mile (7/km2). There were 9,238 housing units at an average density of 17 per square mile (7/km2). The ethnic makeup of the county was 98.36% White, 0.24% Black or African American, 0.36% Native American, 0.10% Asian, 0.10% from other races, and 0.84% from two or more ethnic groups. 0.65% of the population were Hispanic or Latino of any ethnic group. 28.3% were of German, 12.7% English, 9.5% American, 8.8% Irish, 7.6% Polish and 7.4% French ancestry, 98.1% spoke English as their first language.

There were 4,455 households, out of which 22.50% had children under the age of 18 living with them, 58.10% were married couples living together, 7.10% had a female householder with no husband present, and 31.60% were non-families. 27.50% of all households were made up of individuals, and 15.40% had someone living alone who was 65 years of age or older. The average household size was 2.29 and the average family size was 2.75.

The county population contained 20.30% under the age of 18, 5.90% from 18 to 24, 20.90% from 25 to 44, 29.10% from 45 to 64, and 23.90% who were 65 years of age or older. The median age was 47 years. For every 100 females there were 96.60 males. For every 100 females age 18 and over, there were 94.90 males.

The county's median household income was $30,005, and the median income for a family was $34,784. Males had a median income of $30,910 versus $19,299 for females. The per capita income for the county was $16,493. About 9.80% of families and 12.80% of the population were below the poverty line, including 20.00% of those under age 18 and 8.70% of those age 65 or over.

Economy
Dairy products and dry beans are an important part of the county's agricultural production. Service industry and retail trade relating to tourism make up most of the economic base in this rural area. Boating, fishing, and other outdoor activities are offered in abundance.

Government
Voters in Montmorency County favored Democratic Party nominees at the start, but since 1896 have usually voted for the Republican Party. Republican Party nominees have garnered the Montmorency County vote 76% of the time (26 of 34 elections).

The county government operates the jail, maintains rural roads, operates the major local courts, records deeds, mortgages, and vital records, administers public health regulations, and participates with the state in the provision of social services. The county board of commissioners controls the budget and has limited authority to make laws or ordinances. In Michigan, most local government functions – police and fire, building and zoning, tax assessment, street maintenance etc. – are the responsibility of individual cities and townships.

Elected officials

 Prosecuting Attorney: Vicki Klindinger
 Sheriff: Chad Brown
 County Clerk: Cheryl A. Neilsen
 County Treasurer: Jean Klein
 Register of Deeds: Teresa Walker
 Drain Commissioner: Jim Zavislak
 Road Commissioners: Joseph R. LaFleche; Theodore Orm; Linda Hicks

(information as of August 2018)

Recreation
 Atlanta is the "Elk Capital of Michigan". Every year during opening day of Elk hunting season the largest bagged are displayed at the "buck pole" on the town's central square.  During the off season, driving around in the wilderness surrounding Atlanta looking for these graceful creatures becomes a pastime of locals, cottagers, and tourists.
 Rainbow trout, brook trout, steelhead, perch, bass and other pan fish abound. The county is a hotbed of fly fishing and angling on the edge of some world-class streams and rivers.
White tail deer hunting is a popular local activity and the firearms deer season opening (November 15) being noted as a holiday to some residents, with schools being closed on opening day. Most of the land in Montmorency County is controlled by state or federal government, making the county a popular hunting area.
Snow shoeing, cross-country skiing and snow mobile riding are popular outdoor activities. The Sno*Drift rallying race is held on snowy surfaces in February.
Morel mushroom hunting is a local pastime and attracts many tourists.
There are many recurring events throughout the area, such as the annual sled dog races held near the end of January on Clear Lake State Park.
ORV/ATV and snowmobile trails are some of the state's best. Many areas are designated as "trail mazes" on some maps.  Montmorency County is one of the few counties that allow ATVs on public county roads, thus creating access for fuel, food and various hotels to Hillman, Atlanta, and Lewiston. The main trail system incorporates a scenic Elk tour and various levels of ATV trails.

Media
 The newspaper of record for Montmorency County is the Montmorency County Tribune.

Endangered species
Montmorency County is home to Michigan's most endangered species and one of the most endangered species in the world: the Hungerford's crawling water beetle. The species lives in only five locations in the world, two of which are in Montmorency County, both inside the Mackinaw State Forest. The first site is along the East Branch of the Black River where two adult beetles were found in surveys in 1989 and two more again in 1996. In July 1999, six additional adult beetles were identified in the county living in Van Hetton Creek. This latter find was significant as it represented a new location beyond those originally identified when the Hungerford's crawling water beetle was categorized as endangered on March 7, 1994, under the provisions of the US Endangered Species Act. The Van Hetton Creek sighting therefore provides the possibility that more of these very rare beetles might be found elsewhere in Montmorency County.

Communities

Village
Hillman

Census-designated places
Atlanta (county seat)
Canada Creek Ranch
Lewiston

Townships

Albert Township
Avery Township
Briley Township
Hillman Township
Loud Township
Montmorency Township
Rust Township
Vienna Township

See also
 List of Michigan State Historic Sites in Montmorency County, Michigan

References

External links

 Hillman, Michigan Chamber of Commerce; includes calendar of local events and list of local official addresses, phone numbers
 Atlanta, Michigan Chamber of Commerce; includes calendar of local events
 
 Economic profiler, Montmorency County
 The Enchanted Forest, Northern Michigan source for information, calendars etc.
 Montmorency County home page; includes history of the county
 Montmorency County Tribune

 
Michigan counties
1881 establishments in Michigan
Populated places established in 1881